Philippe Cuelenaere (born 2 September 1971) is a Belgian rower. He competed in the men's coxed pair event at the 1984 Summer Olympics.

References

1971 births
Living people
Belgian male rowers
Olympic rowers of Belgium
Rowers at the 1984 Summer Olympics
Royal Club Nautique de Gand rowers